The elegant slider (Lerista elegans)  is a species of skink found in Western Australia.

References

Lerista
Reptiles described in 1845
Taxa named by John Edward Gray